The 1931 Saint Louis Billikens football team was an American football team that represented Saint Louis University during the 1931 college football season. In their second season under head coach Chile Walsh, the Billikens compiled an 8–2 record and outscored opponents by a total of 239 to 52. The team played its home games at Edward J. Walsh Memorial Stadium in St. Louis.

Schedule

References

Saint Louis
Saint Louis Billikens football seasons
Saint Louis Billikens football